Siddal are an amateur rugby league football club from Halifax, West Yorkshire. The club currently competes in the Premier Division of the National Conference League. The club also operates a number of academy teams. The club is notable as being the first competitive opponents of Canadian professional club, Toronto Wolfpack, to whom they narrowly lost 14–6 in a match streamed worldwide on the BBC Sports website.

Honours
National Conference League Premier Division
Winners (4): 2002–03, 2003–04, 2008–09, 2016
BARLA National Cup
Winners (1): 2008–09
BARLA Yorkshire Cup
Winners (1): 1997–98

References

External links
Official website
Siddal ARLFC at NCL.co.uk

Rugby league teams in West Yorkshire
BARLA teams
English rugby league teams